Operation Mass Appeal was an operation set up by the British Secret Intelligence Service (MI6) in the runup to the 2003 invasion of Iraq. It was a campaign aimed at planting disinformation in the media about Iraq's alleged weapons of mass destruction. The existence of the operation was exposed in December 2003, although officials denied that the operation was deliberately disseminating misinformation. The MI6 operation secretly incorporated the United Nations Special Commission investigating Iraq's alleged stockpiles of Weapons of Mass Destruction (WMD) into its propaganda efforts by recruiting UN weapons inspector and former MI6 collaborator Scott Ritter to provide copies of UN documents and reports on their findings to MI6.

Former UN arms inspector Scott Ritter revealed in his book, Iraq Confidential (2005), the existence of an MI6-run psychological warfare effort, known as Operation Mass Appeal. According to Ritter: "Mass Appeal served as a focal point for passing MI6 intelligence on Iraq to the media, both in the UK and around the world. The goal was to help shape public opinion about Iraq and the threat posed by WMD." MI6 propaganda specialists claimed they could spread the misinformation through "editors and writers who work with us from time to time".

Ritter, in an interview with Amy Goodman of the US news website Democracy Now!, described how he, as an arms inspector for the United Nations Special Commission on Iraq Weapons of Mass Destruction—and UNSCOM itself—became deeply involved in MI6's "Operation Mass Appeal":

References

External links 
Revealed: how MI6 sold the Iraq war (The Sunday Times, 28 December 2003)
Iraq confidential by Scott Ritter, Seymour M Hersh

Causes and prelude of the Iraq War
Iraq–United Kingdom relations
Mass media in the United Kingdom
Military operations of the Iraq War in 2003
Propaganda in the United Kingdom
United Kingdom intelligence operations
Disinformation operations